Tatton is an outer south-eastern suburb of Wagga Wagga, New South Wales, Australia. To the south of Kooringal and to the west of Lake Albert, Tatton is one of Wagga Wagga's more expensive new suburbs. Subdivision of what was an area dominated by small rural holdings, commenced in the 1990s. Tatton Public School was previously located within the confines of the suburb, however this school closed down prior to the commencement of any significant development. Today the suburb is serviced by the private Lutheran Primary School.

References

External links 

Suburbs of Wagga Wagga